This is a list of finalists for the 1994 Archibald Prize for portraiture (listed is Artist – Title).

 Roger Akinin – Portrait of Joseph Graffi
 Bruce Armstrong – Jan Senbergs
 Bob Baird – Salvatore Zofrea – Psalm 58
 Li (David) Baohua – Portrait (Hazel Hawke)
 Kevin Connor – Portrait of Hendrik Kolenberg
 Fred Cress – Other Selves
 John Edwards – Tess Knight (Artist, Friend, Academic)
 Francis Giacco – Homage to John Reichard (Winner: Archibald Prize 1994) (Image)
 George Gittoes – Self Portrait in Somalia
 James Gleeson – Portrait of the Artist as an Evolving Landscape
 Robert Hannaford – Self Portrait
 Robert Hannaford – The Lord Mayor
 Nicholas Harding – Portrait of Kenneth W Tribe
 Hongbin Zhao – Graeme McMahon
 Bill Leak – Malcolm Turnbull (People's Choice)
 Kerrie Lester – Richard Goodwin
 Lewis Miller – John Wolseley
 Ann Morton – Self Portrait
 Henry Mulholland – Susie Carleton
 Gretel Pinniger – The Enlightened Educator – Dr Bruce Carter, Headmaster of Cranbrook, with his son Nick and the artist's son Sigi
 Peter Robertson – Kate Ceberano (Packing Room Prize)
 William Robinson – Unanimous Self Portrait
 Jenny Sages – Loti and Victor Smorgon
 John Scurry – Portrait of Allan Mitelman, painter
 Wendy Sharpe – Self-portrait
 Garry Shead – Alice Kalmar-Spigelman
 Jiawei Shen – Hedda's camera (Portrait of Claire Roberts) (Image)
 Ian Smith – Ray Hughes
 Ann Thomson – David Malouf
 Rosemary Valadon – Noni Hazlehurst – Summer '94 Waiting Again
 David Van Nunen – Portrait of the Artist as a Young Man on a Horse
 Wes Walters – David Hobson as Orpheus

See also
Previous year: List of Archibald Prize 1993 finalists
Next year: List of Archibald Prize 1995 finalists
List of Archibald Prize winners
Lists of Archibald Prize finalists

External links
Archibald Prize 1994 finalists official website

1994
Archibald Prize 1994
Archibald Prize 1994
1994 in art
Arch